Digby Pearson (born 1962), also known as "Dig", is an English musician, producer and businessman. He is the founder of independent record label Earache Records.

Biography
Born and raised in Nottingham, he was introduced to extreme music whilst playing in local bands, one of which being DIY punk band Scum Dribblurzzz, who never released any records or accepted payment for playing shows.

In the mid-1980s, he founded Earache, and gradually began releasing records. He says the first year of business, 1986, was spent doing very little. He claims he initially set up the label as a way to continue to claim social security benefits without having to go to the unemployment office every two weeks, saying, "I didn't fancy doing that". He started releasing Flexi discs, and then moved on to putting out a split between Concrete Sox and Heresy, and an album by The Accüsed. In 1987 he compiled two sessions by different line-ups of the band Napalm Death, and released them as the album Scum. The album proved popular, peaking at No. 7 on the UK Indie Chart and receiving airplay on John Peel's show on BBC Radio 1. Both Napalm Death and Heresy are considered to be pioneering grindcore bands.

Pearson is responsible for signing many pioneering heavy bands including At the Gates, Bolt Thrower, Carcass, Cathedral, Godflesh, Anal Cunt, Entombed, Morbid Angel as well as Deicide, Mortiis, and The Berzerker, as well as releasing more techno-oriented music, and reissues of the label's earlier albums.

In 2015, Pearson won the "Pioneer Award" from the AIM Independent Music Awards.

References

External links
Interview and biography with Pearson
Earache Records Website.

1962 births
Living people
English heavy metal guitarists
English male guitarists
British music industry executives
People from Nottingham